Ryrkaypiy (Chukchi: , Ryrkampan) is a rural locality (a selo) just to the west of Mys Shmidta in Iultinsky District of Chukotka Autonomous Okrug, Russia. Municipally, Ryrkaypiy is incorporated as Ryrkaypiy Rural Settlement. Population: .

Demographics
The village is a small settlement, with a population of 766 as of 2010, of whom 388 were men and 378 women, up considerably from a 2003 estimate of 324. Most of the residents are of Chukchi descent.

History and economy
The name of the village means "Place of the Walrus" in Chukchi, or "Walrus Jam", to convey the meaning that there are regularly large numbers of Walrus in the vicinity. Unsurprisingly, marine hunting has traditionally been a key source of food and employment for the local indigenous people.

As with several of the rural settlements throughout Chukotka, Ryrkaipiy was the centre for a collectivised farm centred on reindeer. It was the central farmstead for the largest of all the reindeer herding farms throughout Chukotka, named Pioneer. Unlike other rural settlements in Chukotka such as Alkatvaam in Beringovsky District and Tavaivaam in Anadyrsky District, following the collapse of the Soviet Union and payments to the farms from the government effectively ceased as Russia moved to a market economy, the workers on this farm were able to keep their reindeer herds going and these herds are still the major source of employment for the local people, despite living on the coast.

As with many Chukotkan villages, there are strong efforts made to keep the traditions of the indigenous peoples alive and although Ryrkaipiy has modern facilities such as a hospital, post office, high school and daycare centre there is also a traditional Chukchi ensemble and cultural centre and Northern Star Native Women's Club.

Towards the end of November 2017, the village received coverage in international news when the sudden death of a large amount of walrus, and the subsequent drift of the corpses towards the village, attracted a large number of polar bears, causing a state of high alert with children forbidden from walking to school and public events cancelled after one bear broke a window in a house.

Transport
Ryrkaypiy is connected to the outside world only via Mys Shmidta. From there, there is a road linking Mys Shmidta with Egvekinot. Within the village, there is also a small network of roads including:

 улица Мира (Ulitsa Mira, lit. Peace Street)
 улица Пламенная (Ulitsa Plamennaya)
 улица Полярная (Ulitsa Polyarnaya, lit. Polar Street)
 улица Солнечная (Ulitsa Solnechnaya, lit. Solar Street)
 улица Строительная (Ulitsa Stroitelnaya, lit Construction Street)
 улица Тевлянто (Ulitsa Tevlyanto, lit Tevlyanto Street)
 улица Транспортная (Ulitsa Transportnaya, lit. Transport Street)
 улица Челюскинцев (Ulitsa Chelyuskintsev, lit Chelyuskin Street)
 улица Шмидта (Ulitsa Shmidta, lit Shmidt Street)

Climate

See also
List of inhabited localities in Iultinsky District

References

Notes

Sources
 
 
 

M Strogoff, P-C Brochet, and D. Auzias Petit Futé: Chukotka (2006). "Avant-Garde" Publishing House.

External links
Ryrkaypiy photo gallery 
Short film on Ryrkaypiy 

Populated places of Arctic Russia
Rural localities in Chukotka Autonomous Okrug
Chukchi Sea